A cold open (also called a teaser sequence) is a narrative technique used in television and films. It is the practice of jumping directly into a story at the beginning of the show before the title sequence or opening credits are shown. In North American television, this is often done on the theory that involving the audience in the plot as soon as possible will reduce the likelihood of their switching from a show during the opening commercial. A cold open may also be used to recap events in previous episodes or storylines that will be revisited during the current episode.

The cold open technique is sometimes used in films. There, "cold opening" still refers to the opening moments or scenes, but not necessarily to the full duration before the title card, as the title card might appear well after the start.

Development
In the early 1960s, few American series used cold opens, and half-hour situation comedies almost never made use of them prior to 1965. Many American series that ran from the early 1960s through the middle years of the decade (even sitcoms) adopted cold opens in later seasons. However, beginning in the late '50s, several dramatic series, notably such Warner Bros. shows as 77 Sunset Strip, would cold-open with an attention-grabbing scene from the middle of the episode, which would repeat when the story arrived at that point.

Cold opens became widespread on American television by the mid-1960s. Their use was an economical way of setting up a plot without having to introduce the regular characters, or even the series synopsis, which would typically be outlined in the title sequence itself.

British producer Lew Grade's many attempts to break into the American market meant that various shows he was involved with incorporated the cold open. Later, many British action-adventure series employed the format, such as The New Avengers (1976–1977) and The Professionals (1977–1981).

During the 1960s and 1970s, daytime soap operas became the main users of cold opens, with most American soaps employing the format.

In the late 1970s and early 1980s, some shows began with highlights from the previous episode. Also throughout the 1970s and 1980s, many traditional multi-camera sitcoms usually launched straight into the opening theme song, although this has changed in modern use. Today, between the 2000s and 2010s, most multi-camera and single-camera American sitcoms usually use cold opens for each episode, that last for at least 1–2 minutes (and 3–4 minutes at the most) before transitioning into the opening title sequence or theme song of the show.

Documentaries do not use cold openings as frequently as fictional shows. The World at War (1973–1974) is one famous exception, wherein a few short minutes an especially poignant moment is featured; after the title sequence, the events that explain the episode are outlined more fully.

Current uses in television

News 
Most American news shows, including on channels providing 24-hour news coverage, use cold opens to introduce a summary of the stories covered in that edition.

Dramas
Cold opens are common in science fiction dramas and crime dramas. In the U.S., TV shows will occasionally forgo a standard cold open at the midway point of a two-part episode, or during a "special" episode. Vince Gilligan has been declared "Undisputed Master of the Cold Open" in multiple reviews, detailing particular episodes of Better Call Saul and Breaking Bad.

Soap operas
While several soaps experimented with regular opens in the early 2000s, all U.S. daytime dramas are currently using cold opens. Typically, a soap opera cold open begins where the last scene of the previous episode ended, sometimes replaying the entire last scene. After several scenes – usually, to set up which storylines will be featured in the episode – the opening credits are shown. By contrast, most British soap operas typically begin with regular opens.

Comedy
One of the most well-known users of the technique, Saturday Night Live has regularly used a cold-open sketch since its start in 1975. Many modern American sitcoms use or used cold opens, such as The Office, The Big Bang Theory, Two and a Half Men, and Parks and Recreation. Another well-known use of a cold open in comedy is in the NBC show Brooklyn Nine-Nine, which starred SNL alum Andy Samberg. Many other comedy formats also use cold opens, including late-night talk shows and satirical 'news' shows.

Children's programming
Several American children's shows use cold opens, such as Animaniacs and The Upside Down Show. Pokémon, for example, uses the technique to set up the main conflict or plot of the episode.

In other media

Film

In film production, the section of the film before the opening credits is called the pre-credits, and they are sometimes crafted as a cold open. A classic example is the series of James Bond movies, which traditionally start with a cold open showing a dramatic conflict or chase scene.

In some films, the title card does not appear until the end. In such cases, one cannot refer to the entire film as the "opening", and the term "cold open" in these instances refers to the opening moments or scenes.

Likewise, in films with excessively long pre-credits sequences, the "cold open" does not necessarily refer to the entire pre-credits sequence.

Podcasts
Cold opens are occasionally used in the beginning of Podcasts and the reason for its utilization may change depending on the genre or theme of each respective Podcast and its frequency can vary. Some podcasts such as TrueAnon use a cold open at the start of every episode which may include either a skit or off-topic conversation between its two main hosts and producer before going into the intro of the podcast. Since early 2022, the weekly Nobody Listens to Paula Poundstone regularly employs cold opens, which often include the cast self-reflexively discussing the use and effectiveness of cold opens and "grabbers."

Radio
Cold opens were also an occasional device in radio. Jack Benny's weekly program would usually begin with Don Wilson reading standard copy announcing the name of the program and introducing the stars. Sometimes, however, particularly for a show at the start of a new season, the actors would launch into the material without any announcement and perform a sketch written to give the audience the impression they were eavesdropping on the stars' off-microphone lives. That would be followed by the more standard Don Wilson introductions and the show would proceed as usual after that.

Video games
Many video games have included cold opens. These either begin with a lengthy opening sequence or include an entire level before the titles. It is common in Japanese RPGs, with the original Final Fantasy an early example.

Nomenclature
Cold opens sometimes employ a segment known as a "teaser" or "tease". A memorandum was written by Gene Roddenberry on May 2, 1966, as a supplement to the Writer-Director Information Guide for the original Star Trek series, describing the format of a typical episode. This quotation refers to a cold open, commonly known as a teaser:

The "hook" of the teaser was some unexplained plot element that was alluded to in the teaser, or cold open, which was intended to keep audiences interested enough in the show to dissuade them from changing stations while the titles and opening commercial roll.

In television series, a similar technique called a cliffhanger is often employed before commercial breaks, to keep the audience from switching channels during the break.

A closing scene at the end of a show, after end credits, is known as the "tag".

See also
Hot switch
In medias res

References

Film and television opening sequences
Television terminology
Film and video terminology